Rose o' the River is a 1919 American drama silent film directed by Robert Thornby and written by Kate Douglas Wiggin and Will M. Ritchey. The film stars Lila Lee, Darrell Foss, George Fisher, Robert Brower, Josephine Crowell, and Sylvia Ashton. The film was released on July 20, 1919, by Paramount Pictures. It is not known whether the film currently survives.

Plot
As described in a film magazine, Rose (Lee) is the center of a typical circle of small town admirers, dangling them all but laying most carefully the chosen suitor Steve Waterman (Foss), foreman of the lumber gang working the forest near her home. They become engaged and he begins constructing a little home when Claude Merrill, a ribbon clerk from Boston who is pretending to be a big businessman, arrives in the community and gives ardent court. Although true to her first love, she is so impressed by her new admirer's devotion that she gives him a tender farewell, which is seen by her fiance. Believing the worst, Steve breaks off the engagement, and Rose welcomes an opportunity to go to Boston as nurse to Steve's ailing aunt. Here she learns the clerk's true estate and returns to the country, but finds patching up the quarrel with Steve difficult. When a lumberjack makes a slurring remark about her, however, her uncle hears her former sweetheart Steve's defense of her and his declaration that he would marry her if she would let him. It is then a simple matter for her to bring about a reconciliation and precipitate the ceremony.

Cast
Lila Lee as Rose Wiley
Darrell Foss as Steve Waterman
George Fisher as Claude Merrill
Robert Brower as Grandfather Wiley
Josephine Crowell as Grandmother Wiley
Sylvia Ashton as Mrs. Ann Brooks
Jack Brammall as Alcestic Crambry

References

External links 
 

1919 films
1910s English-language films
Silent American drama films
1919 drama films
Paramount Pictures films
Films directed by Robert Thornby
American black-and-white films
American silent feature films
1910s American films
English-language drama films